Ocean City is a census-designated place (CDP) in Grays Harbor County, Washington, United States. The population was 200 at the 2010 census.

Geography
Ocean City is located in western Grays Harbor County at  (47.070014, -124.165790). It is bordered to the north by Copalis Beach, to the south by Hogans Corner, to the east by State Route 109 and Cranberry Creek, and to the west by the Pacific Ocean. SR 109 leads north  to Moclips and southeast  to Hoquiam.

Demographics
As of the census of 2000, there were 217 people, 117 households, and 54 families residing in the CDP. The population density was 49.9 people per square mile (19.3/km2). There were 250 housing units at an average density of 57.5/sq mi (22.2/km2). The racial makeup of the CDP was 88.94% White, 0.92% African American, 5.99% Native American, 0.46% Asian, 2.76% from other races, and 0.92% from two or more races. Hispanic or Latino of any race were 2.76% of the population.

There were 117 households, out of which 12.8% had children under the age of 18 living with them, 39.3% were married couples living together, 3.4% had a female householder with no husband present, and 53.8% were non-families. 41.9% of all households were made up of individuals, and 16.2% had someone living alone who was 65 years of age or older. The average household size was 1.85 and the average family size was 2.56.

In the CDP, the population was spread out, with 14.3% under the age of 18, 2.8% from 18 to 24, 26.7% from 25 to 44, 40.6% from 45 to 64, and 15.7% who were 65 years of age or older. The median age was 48 years. For every 100 females, there were 110.7 males. For every 100 females age 18 and over, there were 116.3 males.

The median income for a household in the CDP was $17,813, and the median income for a family was $26,979. Males had a median income of $16,250 versus $26,250 for females. The per capita income for the CDP was $15,468. None of the families and 14.0% of the population were living below the poverty line, including no under eighteens and 18.8% of those over 64.

References

Census-designated places in Grays Harbor County, Washington
Census-designated places in Washington (state)
Populated coastal places in Washington (state)